Julius is a masculine given name and a surname, derived from the nomen of a Roman family, most famously Julius Caesar. The name may be derived from Greek ιουλος (ioulos)  or from Latin Jovilius . Julio/Júlio is the Spanish/Portuguese form and Jules is the French form.

Given name 
Pope Julius (disambiguation), multiple popes
Julius the Veteran (255–302), Catholic, Anglican and Eastern Orthodox saint and martyr
Julius (judge royal) (fl. before 1135), a nobleman in the Kingdom of Hungary
Julius, Count of Lippe-Biesterfeld (1812–1884), German noble
Julius, Duke of Brunswick-Lüneburg (1528–1589), German noble
Julius Aghahowa (born 1982), Nigerian footballer
Julius Akosah (born 1982), Cameroonian-Hongkonger (soccer) footballer
Julius Axelrod (1912–2004), an American biochemist
Julius Babao (born 1968), Filipino broadcast journalist
Julius Bacher (1810–1889), German playwright and novelist
Julius Bär (1857–1922), German banker
Julius Boros (1920–1994), American golfer
Julius Brents (born 2000), American football player
Julius Brink (born 1982), German beach volleyball player
Julius Büdel (1903–1983), German geomorphologist
Julius Chestnut (born 2000), American football player
Julius Eastman (1940–1990),  American composer
Julius Erving (born 1950), American basketball player
Julius Evola (1898–1974), Italian philosopher
Julius Fučík (composer) (1872–1916), Czech composer, the journalist's uncle
Julius Fučík (journalist) (1903–1943), Czech journalist, the composer's nephew
Julius Gregory (born 1988),  American football player
Julius Hirsch (1892–1945), Jewish German soccer player and Iron Cross recipient
Julius Kuperjanov (1894–1919), Estonian teacher and military officer
Julius Köbner (1806–1884), Danish Baptist pioneer
Julius Ingram (1832–1917), American politician.
Julius Lenck (1845–1901), Hungarian-German brewer and businessman
Julius Ludolf (1893–1947), German SS officer and concentration camp commandant
Julius Wandera Maganda (born 1971), Ugandan politician
Julius Mägiste (1900–1978), Estonian linguist and academic
Julius Malema (born 1981), South African politician
 Julius Mandel aka Gyula Mándi (1899–1969), Hungarian Olympic footballer and manager
Julius Masvanise (born 1966), Zimbabwean track and field athlete
Julius Nyerere (1922–1999), president of Tanzania
Julius Petersen (1839–1910), Danish mathematician
Julius Richard Petri (1852–1921), German bacteriologist
Julius Randle (born 1994), American professional basketball player
Julius Reubke (1834–1858), German composer, pianist and organist.
Julius La Rosa (1930–2016), American pop singer
Julius Rudel (1921–2014), Austrian-born American opera and orchestra conductor
Julius Rosenberg (1918–1953), American communist
Julius Schaub (1898–1976), chief aide and adjutant to Adolf Hitler
Julius Schwartz (1915–2004), American comic book and pulp magazine editor
Julius Seligson (1909–1987), American tennis player
Julius Streicher (1885–1946), notorious Nazi newspaper editor
Julius Terpstra (born 1989), Dutch politician
Julius Travis (1869–1961), American Justice of the Indiana Supreme Court
Julius Warmsley (born 1990), American football player
Julius Zeyer (1841–1901), Czech romantic writer

Surname
Andrew Julius (born 1984), international footballer from Montserrat
Anthony Julius (born 1956), British lawyer and academic
Churchill Julius (1847–1938), first Archbishop of New Zealand
David Julius (born 1955), American physiologist
DeAnne Julius (born 1949), British-based American economist
Eva Julius (1878-1972), Australian Girlguiding leader, wife of George
George Julius (1873–1946), Australian inventor and engineer, husband of Eva
Harry Julius (1885–1938), Australian commercial artist
Leigh Julius (born 1985), South African sprinter
Max Julius (1916–1963), Australian barrister and communist
Orlando Julius (1943–2022), Nigerian musician
E. Haldeman-Julius (né Emanuel Julius) (1889–1951), Jewish-American socialist

Fictional characters
 Julius, book by Angela Johnson, illustrated by Dav Pilkey
 Julius, song by the band Phish on their album Hoist
Julius Caesar, fictional character, Japanese name of Julian Konzern from the animated series Beyblade: Metal Masters (Metal Fight Beyblade: Explosion in Japan)
Julius Hibbert, a character from The Simpsons TV series
 Julius Little, fictional character in the Xbox 360 game Saints Row
 Julius Pringles, the name of the mascot for Pringles potato crisps
 Julius, a comic monkey character created by Paul Frank
 Julius, the father from the television series Everybody Hates Chris
 Julius, one of the main characters from the Canadian animated series Delilah & Julius
 The faction House of Julii from the computer game Rome: Total War uses Julius as the family name
 Julius Belmont, vampire hunter and descendant of Simon Belmont from the Castlevania series of video games
 Julius, a monster in the 1995 animated Mickey Mouse short, Runaway Brain
 Dr. Julius Strangepork, a character in The Muppets
Julius the Cat, Walt Disney's first recurring animated character.
 Julius Zebra, a book franchise from author Gary Northfield.
Julius Oppenheimmer Jr., a character from The Amazing World of Gumball.
 Julius Euclius, a character from Re:Zero − Starting Life in Another World

See also
Julius (disambiguation)
Jukka Nevalainen, a Finnish drummer whose nickname is Julius

References 

Latin masculine given names
Greek masculine given names
Czech masculine given names
Danish masculine given names
Dutch masculine given names
English masculine given names
Estonian masculine given names
German masculine given names
Lithuanian masculine given names
Norwegian masculine given names
Swedish masculine given names